The Kanzhal War or Crimean-Circassian War of 1708 was military conflict in 1708 fought between 7,000 Circassians led by Kurgoqo Atajuq and 30,000-100,000 Crimean Tatars led by Qaplan I Giray, which resulted in Circassian victory. It played a big role in decreasing foreign influence in Circassia. In 2013, the Russian Academy of Sciences described the battle as "an important event in the history of Circassians". It was fought near the village of Bylym on the Baksan River.

General 

In 1708, the Circassians paid a great tribute to the Ottoman sultan Ahmed III to be exempt from Tatar raids and extra tribute, but the sultan did not take measures and the Tatars raided and plundered all the way to the east of Circassia, and asked for double tribute. The Kabardian Circassians announced that they would not pay double tribute to the Crimean Khan and the Ottoman Sultan. The Ottomans sent their army of at least 20,000 men to Kabardia under the leadership of the Crimean khan Qaplan I Giray to defeat the Circassians and collect tribute. The Ottomans expected an easy victory against the Circassians, but the Circassians were victorious with the strategy set up by the Jabagh Qazaneqo and returned to paying normal tribute.

Although foreign sources report different figures on the number of the Crimean-Ottoman army, criticals consider the figure of at least 25–30 thousand people to be reliable. This figure is in particular a reference to the letter of Prince Tatarhan Bekmurzovich, who should know the number of his enemy.

Circassians pretended to escape from the Tatar armies, and led them into the center of Circassia. They then sent letters to Khan's camp expressing their obedience, willingness to pay tribute and asked for peace. Later, for 19 days, 30 Circassian spies stalled the enemy troops by negotiating the amount and quality of the tribute to be paid, and then unexpectedly attacked the camp from all sides, and applied the strategy of Qazaneqo Jabagh: Donkeys with scary masks were put on fire, making them look like otherworldly monsters, greatly reducing morale of the Crimean army. Circassians then charged, and the Crimean-Ottoman army was completely destroyed overnight. Exhausted from the war, the Circassians wandered the battlefield for several days looking for survivors, both of them and their enemies. According to Shora Nogmov, they found Alegot Pasha, who, unconsciously and desperately fled from the battlefield and fell off a cliff, clung to a tree with his feet and died on the spot. Some recent research has claimed that the noble Nogay Murza Allaguvat was hiding under the name Alegoth.

Mentions of the event by foreign sources

Abri de la Motre 
Abri de la Motre (agent of the Swedish king Charles XII), who visited the Caucasus in 1711, gave a detailed description of this battle. Motre published a description of his travels in London in 1724 in English in two volumes. He republished them in French in 1727.

A brief chronology of events, according to Motre, is as follows:

 Circassians paid a large annual tribute to the sultan to avoid Tatar raids. However, the sultan did not fulfill this obligation and the Tatars raided all the way to the center of Circassia, robbing everything they could.
 Circassians thought not only to stop these attacks, but also to refuse to pay tribute. The Sultan formed a Tatar army against the Circassians (about 100 thousand in number, according to Motre).
 Circassians sent letters to Khan's camp expressing their obedience and asking for peace. Later, for 19 days, the Circassians stalled the enemy troops by negotiating the amount and quality of the tribute to be paid, and then unexpectedly attacked the camp from all sides and killed most of the soldiers.
 Leading those who escaped to save their lives, the Khan left his brother, son, field tools, tents and belongings.

Xaverio Glavani 
Xaverio Glavani, the French consul in Crimea and the first doctor of the Khan in Bakhchysarai, wrote in his book "Circassian Statement" dated 20 January 1724:

Johann Gustav Gerber 
Johann Gustav Gerber, who made a map of the Caucasus for Tsarist Russia in 1728 and a depiction of the peoples living in the Caucasus, also reported this war:

Engelbert Kämpfer 
German traveler Engelbert Kämpfer also mentioned the event:

Other sources 
In addition to the above, in the 18th century Ottoman writer Mehmet Funduklu, the former Moldovan ruler and scientist Dimitrie Cantemir and many others wrote about the victory of the Kabardinians over the Crimean Khan in 1708, although their reports agreed on the main point, sometimes differing in detail.

Legacy 
In 2008, Circassians celebrated the 300th anniversary of their victory in the Battle of Kanzhal. Circassian activists organized a trip in the direction of the war and a monument was erected in the area.

In 2018, events were organized for the 310th anniversary of the war. However, in the village of Kendelen, the local people of Balkar origin blocked the path of a Circassian flag group and attacked the celebrating Circassians, and Russian forces intervened as clashes between Circassians and Balkars intensified.

Similar clashes occurred in 2008 when the people of Karachay-Balkar hung posters "There was no battle in Kanzhal".

References 

18th-century conflicts
18th century in the Crimean Khanate
Wars involving the Circassians
Military operations involving the Crimean Khanate
Kanzhal
Kanzhal